Cheshmeh Tala (also Romanized as Cheshmeh Ţalā) is a village in Kakasharaf Rural District, in the Central District of Khorramabad County, Lorestan Province, Iran. At the 2006 census, its population was 31, in 8 families.

References 

Towns and villages in Khorramabad County